The 2015 Qatar motorcycle Grand Prix was the first round of the 2015 Grand Prix motorcycle racing season. It was held at the Losail International Circuit in Lusail, Qatar on 29 March 2015.

In the MotoGP class, Ducati's Andrea Dovizioso took the first pole position of the season. It was an eventful race in which the lead was contested between the Movistar Yamaha and Ducati teams. For the first time since the 2006 Japanese Grand Prix, the podium was swept by Italian riders, as Yamaha's Valentino Rossi – in his 20th Grand Prix season – took his first season-opening victory since 2010, ahead of Dovizioso, and his teammate Andrea Iannone, who achieved his first MotoGP podium in third place. Reigning world champion Marc Márquez had a good start position, third on the grid, but went off track and almost hit Jorge Lorenzo and Bradley Smith. After he fell to the rear of the field due to the first-lap incident, Márquez overtook several riders and was able to finish fifth, behind Lorenzo.

Dani Pedrosa started second on the grid, but dropped to sixth place due to issues with arm-pump. Álvaro Bautista was forced to retire after his bike was hit by Márquez, breaking his left brake lever and front sensor. Rookie Jack Miller – graduating from Moto3 – crashed with Karel Abraham with one lap remaining.

The weekend also saw the début of the new Aprilia RS-GP, which was used by Gresini Racing after the team switched from Honda at the end of 2014. This was Aprilia's first race in MotoGP as a factory team since the 2004 Valencian Grand Prix.

Classification

MotoGP

Moto2

Moto3

Championship standings after the race (MotoGP)
Below are the standings for the top five riders and constructors after round one has concluded.

Riders' Championship standings

Constructors' Championship standings

Teams' Championship standings

 Note: Only the top four positions are included for all sets of standings.

References

2015 MotoGP race reports
2015 in Qatari sport
2015
Qatar motorcycle Grand Prix